I'd Give My Life is a 1936 American drama film directed by Edwin L. Marin and written by George O'Neil based upon the play The Noose. The film stars Guy Standing, Frances Drake, Tom Brown, Janet Beecher, Robert Gleckler, and Helen Lowell. The film was released on August 14, 1936, by Paramount Pictures.

The play was previously filmed as The Noose (1928).

Plot

Cast 
Sir Guy Standing as Governor John Bancroft 
Frances Drake as Mary Reyburn
Tom Brown as Nickie Elkins
Janet Beecher as Mrs. Bancroft
Robert Gleckler as Buck Gordon
Helen Lowell as Mrs. Bancroft, Sr.
Paul Hurst as Conly
Charles C. Wilson as Warden
Charles Richman as Attorney Bill Chase
Thomas E. Jackson as Doyle

References

External links 
 

1936 films
1930s English-language films
American drama films
1936 drama films
Paramount Pictures films
Films directed by Edwin L. Marin
American black-and-white films
Remakes of American films
American films based on plays
1930s American films